Paludinella semperi is a species of minute salt marsh snail with an operculum, an aquatic gastropod mollusk or micromollusk in the family Assimineidae. This species is found in Marshall Islands and Palau.

References

Paludinella
Assimineidae
Gastropods described in 1927
Taxonomy articles created by Polbot